Events in the year 1907 in Bulgaria.

Incumbents

Events 

 The Varna Shipyard was founded.

References 

 
1900s in Bulgaria
Years of the 20th century in Bulgaria
Bulgaria
Bulgaria